"This Is Who I Am" is a song by Australian recording artist Vanessa Amorosi. It was released in Australian on 9 October 2009 as the lead single from Amorosi's fourth studio album Hazardous. The song debuted at number 1 on the ARIA charts; becoming Amorosi's first number one single. When she heard this, Amorosi said "I am completely overwhelmed when I heard 'This Is Who I Am' came in at number one. I am so excited and thrilled to have the support from both the media and my fans. It is my first number one single and I will absolutely treasure this moment."

Promotion
"This Is Who I Am" made its radio debut on the Kyle & Jackie O show on 28 August 2009 on the Fox FM radio station in Melbourne.

On 26 September 2009, Amorosi performed "This Is Who I Am" live on Channel 9's AFL Grand Final Breakfast. On 3 October 2009, Amorosi performed the song during Telethon in Perth.

Music video
The video clip for "This Is Who I Am" was shot in Los Angeles and directed by Christopher R. Watson. The video was shot on green screen and was launched on 14 September 2009.

The video premiered on Take 40 Australia and The Hot Hits' web pages a few days before its official release.

Track listing
CD single

Charts
"This Is Who I Am" is Amorosi's first number-one single in Australia. Her single is also the first Australian female artist's single to debut at number one since Kylie Minogue's "2 Hearts" back in 2007, and the first debut number-one single since Flo Rida's "Right Round".

Weekly charts

Year-end charts

Certifications

Release history

See also
 List of number-one singles in Australia in 2009

References

Vanessa Amorosi songs
2009 singles
Number-one singles in Australia
Song recordings produced by MachoPsycho
Songs written by Vanessa Amorosi
Universal Music Australia singles